James Crofton was the Chief Clerk of the Irish Treasury in 1804.

Around 1800 he purchased Roebuck Castle, County Dublin, from Nicholas Barnewall, 14th Baron Trimlestown.

References 

Irish civil servants
19th-century Irish landowners
Year of birth missing
Year of death missing